Bernice is a town in Delaware County, Oklahoma, United States. The population was 562 at the 2010 census, an increase of 11.5 percent over the figure of 504 recorded in 2000. The town is now primarily a vacation and retirement area. It claims to be the "Crappie Fishing Capital of the World."

History
Bernice was founded in 1912, after Rose Mode and his partner, Charles Lee, bought  of land in the Horse Creek Basin of northwestern Delaware County. The town was named for Mode's daughter, Bernice. A post office was established on February 12, 1913, and the town soon become a local agricultural center. By 1918, Bernice had an estimated population on nearly 400 people. Businesses included a bank, a milliner, a grain elevator, a sawmill, a hotel, a flour mill and three general stores. The population declined after World War I and the Great Depression from 198 in 1920 to 162 in 1930, and 91 in 1940. After World War II, population growth rebounded to 318 in 1980.

Construction of Pensacola Dam and Grand Lake o' the Cherokees put the original town in a flood plain, so the residents moved to high ground outside the proposed lake.

At present, the town serves as a vacation spot for many residents of surrounding communities. Indian Hills Resort, the oldest recreational business in the town, was established in 1940. Bernice State Park, approximately one-half mile east of town, across the Neosho River, also attracts vacationers.

Geography
Bernice is located along the west bank of Horse Creek,  at  (36.625286, -94.913643).

Demographics

As of the census of 2000, there were 504 people, 245 households, and 152 families residing in the town. The racial makeup of the town was 81.35% White, 12.90% Native American, and 5.75% from two or more races. Hispanic or Latino of any race were 1.19% of the population.

There were 245 households, out of which 20.0% had children under the age of 18 living with them, 55.5% were married couples living together, 3.3% had a female householder with no husband present, and 37.6% were non-families. 35.5% of all households were made up of individuals, and 15.5% had someone living alone who was 65 years of age or older. The average household size was 2.06 and the average family size was 2.59.

In the town, the population was spread out, with 16.7% under the age of 18, 6.3% from 18 to 24, 20.8% from 25 to 44, 31.3% from 45 to 64, and 24.8% who were 65 years of age or older. The median age was 51 years. For every 100 females, there were 104.9 males. For every 100 females age 18 and over, there were 102.9 males.

The median income for a household in the town was $24,844, and the median income for a family was $30,288. Males had a median income of $24,444 versus $15,833 for females. The per capita income for the town was $15,005. About 9.5% of families and 14.1% of the population were below the poverty line, including 24.4% of those under age 18 and 13.2% of those age 65 or over.

Education
Most of Bernice is zoned to Cleora Public School while a section to the north is in Afton Public Schools.

References

External links
 Bernice - Encyclopedia of Oklahoma History and Culture
 Map to Bernice

Towns in Delaware County, Oklahoma
Towns in Oklahoma
Populated places established in 1912